The Pierce House is a historic house at 128 Salem Street in Reading, Massachusetts.  The -story wood-frame house was built sometime between 1875 and 1880 for Samuel Pierce, owner of the nearby Pierce Organ Pipe Factory.  The house has Stick style/Eastlake style features, including a steeply pitched gable roof with exposed rafter ends, and an elaborately decorated entry porch with square chamfered columns and brackets in the eaves.

The house was listed on the National Register of Historic Places in 1984.

See also
National Register of Historic Places listings in Reading, Massachusetts
National Register of Historic Places listings in Middlesex County, Massachusetts

References

Houses on the National Register of Historic Places in Reading, Massachusetts
Houses in Reading, Massachusetts
1878 establishments in Massachusetts